State Highway 22 (SH 22), also known as 124th Avenue, is a  state highway in Brighton, Colorado, United States, that connects Brighton Road with Sable Boulevard.

Route description
SH 22 begins at Sable Boulevard (formerly Colorado State Highway 2. From its easter terminus, it winds westward, crossing various major streets in the city. After crossing U.S. Route 85 (US 85) it exits the Brighton urban area boundary. From there, it crosses the Fulton Canal, ending at Brighton Road, immediately north of the unincorporated community of Henderson.

The route consists of two lanes its entire length and has traffic lights at various intersections along its route.

History
The route was established in early 1940s, first numbered as SH 128. In 1954, it was renumbered to SH 22. The route was paved, as it is today, in 1963.

Major intersections

See also

 List of state highways in Colorado

References

External links

022
State Highway 022